Stegny  is a village in the administrative district of Gmina Tuchola, within Tuchola County, Kuyavian-Pomeranian Voivodeship, in north-central Poland.

References

Stegny